Diaphania cachinalis is a moth in the family Crambidae. It was described by Strand in 1920. It is found in Costa Rica.

References

Moths described in 1920
Diaphania